Euploea modesta, the plain blue crow,  is a butterfly in the family Nymphalidae. It was described by Arthur Gardiner Butler in 1866. It is found in the Indomalayan realm and the Australasian realm.

Subspecies
E. m. modesta (India to Thailand, Vietnam, Peninsular Malaysia, Indo-China)
E. m. lugens Butler, 1876 (Papua, East New Guinea)
E. m. cerberus (Butler, 1882) (East New Guinea - Bismarck Archipelago, Biak)
E. m. buxtoni (Moore, 1883) (Sumatra)
E. m. lorzae (Moore, 1883) (Borneo)
E. m. deheeri (Doherty, 1891) (Sumbawa)
E. m. kuehni Röber, 1891 (Flores)
E. m. obscura Pagenstecher, 1894 (Bismarck Archipelago)
E. m. suavissima Fruhstorfer, 1897 (Lombok)
E. m. salinator Fruhstorfer, 1904 (Alor)
E. m. lamos Fruhstorfer, 1904 (East Java)
E. m. werneri Fruhstorfer, 1909 (Manam Island)
E. m.  misagenes Fruhstorfer, 1910 (Karkar Island)
E. m. deriopes Fruhstorfer, 1911  (Hainan)
E. m. insulicola Strand, 1914 (Admiralty Islands)
E. m. incerta Joicey & Noakes, 1915 (Biak)
E. m. tiomana  Corbet, 1937 (Pulau Tioman)
E. m. jennessi Carpenter, 1941 (Goodenough Island)

References

External links
Funet.fi by Markku Savela

modesta
Butterflies described in 1866
Butterflies of Asia
Butterflies of Oceania